In early Irish folklore, the bánánach were preternatural beings, described as spectres which haunted battlefields.

See also
 Badb
 Banshee

References

Further reading
Sayers, William (1991). "Airdrech, Sirite and Other Early Irish Battlefield Spirits". Éigse XXV: 45–55.
Henry, P. L. (1958-9). "The Goblin Group". Études Celtiques 8: 404–16.

Aos Sí
Fairies
Fantasy creatures
Female legendary creatures
Irish folklore
Irish ghosts
Irish legendary creatures
Scottish mythology
Tuatha Dé Danann